Baj or BAJ may refer to:

People 
 Baj Singh (died 1716), Sikh general
 Enrico Baj (1924–2003), Italian artist and art writer
 Stanisław Baj (born 1953), Polish painter
 Tommaso Baj (c. 1650–1714), Italian conductor, composer and tenor

BAJ 
 Bachelor of Arts, Journalism
 Bridge Asia Japan, a non-governmental organisation
 Bank Aljazira, a Saudi Arabian financial group
 Belarusian Association of Journalists, a Belarusian non-governmental organisation 
 Berliner Astronomisches Jahrbuch, an astronomical ephemeris almanac

Other uses 
 Baj, Hungary, a village
 Baj Ganjo, a character created by Bulgarian author Aleko Konstantinov
 baj, ISO 639-3 code for the Barakai language, spoken on the Aru Islands of Indonesia

See also 
 Bajs (disambiguation)